Muranovo (Russian: Мураново) is a village in the Pushkinsky District, Moscow Oblast, Russia. Muranovo lies along the main road 46K–8140 and it has 11 roads in its area boundaries. Muranovo also has a church, a cafe, a park, a museum, a farm shop and a fishmonger. The memorial museum in Muranovo was created by the descendants of Fyodor Tyutchev on the basis of a family estate but in 1816, the village and consequently, the museum was acquired by Christoph von Engelhardt and his family. The museum was set on fire by a lightning strike in July 2006, but almost all its exhibits were restored, and the museum was declared open to the public again on August 1, 2015.

References 

Rural localities in Moscow Oblast